Heinrich Schaarschmidt (27 February 1930 – 16 January 2019) was a Finnish sailor. He competed in the Dragon event at the 1960 Summer Olympics.

References

External links
 

1930 births
2019 deaths
Finnish male sailors (sport)
Olympic sailors of Finland
Sailors at the 1960 Summer Olympics – Dragon
Sportspeople from Helsinki